Paul Spirakis is a Professor of Computer Science at the University of Liverpool, specialising in Algorithms, Complexity and Algorithmic Game Theory. He has been a professor at the University of Liverpool since 2013 and,  he also is a professor at Patras University. He leads the Algorithms Research section in the Department of Computer Science at the University of Liverpool. He is a Fellow of EATCS and a Member of Academia Europaea.

He is the Editor in Chief  (Track A)  of the journal Theoretical Computer Science.

He completed his S.M in Applied Mathematics (Computer Science) at Harvard University in 1979 followed by a PhD in Applied Mathematics (Computer Science) also at Harvard University in 1982 (supervised by John Reif).

References 

Greek computer scientists
English computer scientists
Harvard School of Engineering and Applied Sciences alumni
Year of birth missing (living people)
Living people
National Technical University of Athens alumni
Academics of the University of Liverpool